Venere.com was a website focusing on online hotel reservations. Its listing included various types of accommodation. Venere.com started in the year 1994 as Venere Net Srl, an online travel agency based in Rome, Italy. 
In 2008, it was acquired by Expedia Group. The president of the company was Johan Svanstrom. The company offered scholarships for Business & Management and Tourism students in Europe and Australia.

History
In 1994, four partners launched Venere.com and developed the first beta version of the hotel booking engine. In February 1995, the first marketing activities were launched for hotels in Rome and Florence. The first reservation arrived in June 1995. 
In 2001, Venere.com became a Joint Stock Company (Venere Net SPA) and opened international offices in London (Venere UK LTD) and Paris (Venere France SARL).

In 2007, the global private equity firm Advent International acquired a 60% stake in Venere Net. Expedia Inc. acquired 100% of Venere.com in 2008. In 2008, Venere.com acquired the Italian online hotel booking agency Worldby.com.

On December 1, 2016, Venere.com was redirected to Hotels.com (another brand owned by Expedia). The Venere.com app became non-operational after this date, with users advised to download the existing Hotels.com app and register an account there instead.

References

Expedia Group
Italian travel websites
Hospitality companies established in 1995
Hospitality companies disestablished in 2016
Internet properties established in 1995
Internet properties disestablished in 2016
2008 mergers and acquisitions
Online travel agencies
Defunct websites